Ceritoturris suavis is a species of sea snail, a marine gastropod mollusk in the family Horaiclavidae.

Description

Distribution
This marine species occurs off the Loyalty Islands.
.

References

 Hervier, J. "Descriptions d'espèces nouvelles de l'Archipel Néo-Calédonien." Journal de Conchyliologie 43.1895 (1896): 141–152.
 Fischer-Piette, E., 1950. Liste des types décrits dans le Journal de Conchyliologie et conservés dans la collection de ce journal (avec planches)(suite). Journal de Conchyliologie 90: 149–180

External links
  Tucker, J.K. 2004 Catalog of recent and fossil turrids (Mollusca: Gastropoda). Zootaxa 682:1–1295.
 Syntype at MNHN, Paris

suavis
Gastropods described in 1896